Eric Cross (31 May 1902 in London – 1 March 2004 in Middlesex) was an English cinematographer.

Selected filmography
 The Flaw (1933)
 The Lure (1933)
 Money for Speed (1933)
 On Thin Ice (1933)
 The Laughter of Fools (1933)
 The Way of Youth (1934)
 Death Drives Through (1935)
 Song of Freedom (1936)
 The Bank Messenger Mystery (1936)
 Strange Cargo (1936)
 Make-Up (1937)
 Splinters in the Air (1937)
 Mr. Reeder in Room 13 (1938)
 Ships with Wings (1941)
 The Man at the Gate (1941)
 The Black Sheep of Whitehall (1942)
 Don't Take It to Heart (1944)
 Chance of a Lifetime (1950)
 The Dark Man (1951)
 Hunted (1952)
 Private Information (1952)
 Escape Route (1952)
 Glad Tidings (1953)
 Death Goes to School (1953)
 Tiger by the Tail (1955)
 Fun at St. Fanny's (1956)
 Private's Progress (1956)
 The One That Got Away (1957)
 The Man Who Liked Funerals (1959)
 Deadly Record (1959)
 Tiger Bay (1959)
 Inn for Trouble (1960)
 Crosstrap (1962)

References

External links

1902 births
2004 deaths
English cinematographers
English centenarians
Men centenarians